Socio-economic impact of the COVID-19 pandemic is covered by:
 Social impact of the COVID-19 pandemic
 Economic impact of the COVID-19 pandemic